Partition  may refer to:

Computing

Hardware 
 Disk partitioning, the division of a hard disk drive
 Memory partition, a subdivision of a computer's memory, usually for use by a single job

Software 
 Partition (database), the division of a database
 Logical partition (LPAR), a subset of a computer's resources, virtualized as a separate computer

Problems 
 Binary space partitioning
 Partition problem, an NP-complete problem in computer science

Mathematics
 Partition (number theory), a way to write a number as a sum of other numbers
 Multiplicative partition, a way to write a number as a product of other numbers
 Partition of an interval
 Partition of a set
 Partition of unity, a certain kind of set of functions on a topological space
 Plane partition
 Graph partition

Natural science
 Partition function (quantum field theory)
 Partition function (statistical mechanics)
 Partition coefficient, a concept in organic chemistry

Law and politics
 Partition (law), the division of an estate
 Partition (politics), a change of political borders
 Partition of Babylon
 Partition of Belgium
 Partition of Bengal (1905)
 Partition of Bengal (1947)
 Partition of Bosnia and Herzegovina
 Partition of India
 Partition of Ireland
 Partition of Kosovo
 Partition of the Ottoman Empire 
 Partitions of Poland
 Partition of Quebec
 Partition of the Soviet Union

 Partition of the United Kingdom
 Partition of Yugoslavia
 Partition and secession in California
 Partition and secession in New York
 United Nations Partition Plan for Palestine

Film and TV
 Partition (1987 film), 1987 British film
 Partition (2007 film), 2007 British film
 Partition: 1947, or Viceroy's House, 2017 British-Indian film

Music
 Another term for Sheet music
 In set theory, Partition (music)
 "Partition" (song), a song by American singer Beyoncé from her eponymous fifth album Beyoncé (2013)
 Partition, soundtrack to 2007 film by Brian Tyler

Other uses
 Folding screen, a piece of furniture
 Ljubljanica Sluice Gate, also named Pregrada
 Partition wall
 Portable partition
 Partition of the field in heraldry

See also
 
 
 Bulkhead (partition)
 Compartment (disambiguation)
 Cubicle
 Divider (disambiguation)
 Part (disambiguation)
 Partition function (disambiguation)
 Section (disambiguation)